Mohammad Addy Ashraf bin Rosmadi (born 20 September 1993), better known by his stage name Aedy Ashraf (Jawi : ايدي أشرف), is a Malaysian actor. Aedy has been in the entertainment industry since the age of 10 years old.

Aedy then went on to act in numerous other box office film, such as Cinta Kolesterol and Jutawan Fakir. He has also been in numerous telemovies and dramas in Malaysia.

In 2015, Aedy signed a management contract with A Klasse, a company led by Asyraf Khalid.

Filmography

Film

Drama

Television movie

Awards and nominations

References

External links
 

Living people
1993 births
People from Kelantan
Malaysian people of Malay descent
Malaysian Muslims
Malaysian male actors